Chendrappini  is a village in Thrissur district in the state of Kerala, India. It is in Kodungallur taluk.T here is a hospital named Al-iqbal. SN Vidyabhavan, a CBSE School is functioning there.

Demographics
 India census, Chendrappini had a population of 16052 with 7395 males and 8657 females.

References

Villages in Thrissur district